Chance of Rain is the second studio album by American electronic music artist Laurel Halo. The album was released on October 28, 2013 by Hyperdub and is Halo's second instrumental release of 2013, alongside her extended play Behind the Green Door. The album cover is the work of Halo's father, Arthur Chartow, drawn in the 1970s.

Critical reception

Upon its release, Chance of Rain was received positively by music critics. On Metacritic, the album received a score of 78 out of 100, based on 21 reviews, indicating "generally favorable reviews". Heather Phares of AllMusic wrote that the album combines "jazz-inspired experimental techno and musique concrète tracks". In his review for Tiny Mix Tapes, DeForrest Brown Jr. defined the music on Chance of Rain as proto-absolute and post-ambient.

Track listing

Personnel
Credits adapted from liner notes of Chance of Rain.

 Laurel Halo – music
 Rashad Becker – mastering
 Arthur Chartow – artwork
 Bill Kouligas – layout

References

Hyperdub albums
Laurel Halo albums
2013 albums
Musique concrète albums